The House of Taga (Chamoru: Guma Taga) is an archeological site located near San Jose Village, on the island of Tinian, United States Commonwealth of the Northern Mariana Islands, in the Marianas Archipelago. The name is derived from a mythological chief named Taga, who is said to have erected the pillars as a foundation for his own house.

The structures

The original megaliths consisted of a base (haligi) and a hemispherical cap (tasa). When uprighted in spaced parallel rows, it is believed a house was built on top. Of the twelve upright stones sketched by British explorer George Anson during his 1742 visit to Tinian, only one remains standing. The As Nieves Rota Latte Stone Quarry is believed to be the Marianas origin of the period of these megalith structures.

Legend of Chief Taga and his house

Alexander Spoehr
In his 1957 published work Marianas Prehistory: Survey and Excavations on Saipin, Tinian and Rota, anthropologist Alexander Spoehr noted that the House of Taga had most likely been the central latte structure among eighteen such structures on Tinian. The chief began the Rota Latte Stone Quarry to carve stone for their home. Midway through, he changed his mind and instead built the house on Tinian.

Variation
One variation on that story also puts Taga's origins at Guam. As a child, he began demonstrating such super-human strength that his own father was jealous and tried to kill him. On Rota, Taga grew to adulthood and became a braggart about his prowess. According to the legend, it was Taga who began the As Nieves Quarry on Rota and abandoned it for reasons that are unclear.

Taga married and had a family, and they sailed to Tinian. His reputation had preceded him, and the chief of Tinian presented several challenges to test Taga's strength. The chief was subsequently so impressed with Taga's abilities that he named Taga the chief of the island. Taga carved the latte stones to single-handedly build his Tinian house and a village for his people. He carried the multi-ton pillars all by himself. As the years passed, while on a trip to Saipan, Taga's wife gave birth to a son that Taga bragged about to no end. Taga's brother tired of all the bragging and challenged Taga to a contest, which ended in a draw between the two brothers. This was the end of Taga's bragging.

Eventually, Taga and his wife were the parents of twelve children. When Taga realized that his youngest son had greater strength than he, Taga flew into a jealous rage and murdered his son. Taga's wife died of grief. His youngest daughter then speared Taga to death and died of a broken heart. As each of Taga's twelve children died, their spirits inhabited the latte stones of his house. Each spirit was released by the individual latte stone falling to the ground. The lone standing megalith today is said to imprison the spirit of the daughter who murdered Taga.

References

Tinian
Mariana Islands culture
Megalithic monuments
Micronesian mythology
National Register of Historic Places in the Northern Mariana Islands
Archaeological sites in the Northern Mariana Islands
Buildings and structures on the National Register of Historic Places in the Northern Mariana Islands